Anamnesis is a compilation album by Scorn, released in 1999 on Invisible Records.

Track listing

Personnel 
Scorn
Nicholas Bullen – vocals and bass guitar (1-3)
Mick Harris – instruments, mixing, recording
Production
Chris Greene – mastering

References 

1999 compilation albums
Scorn (band) albums